Beeby is an English surname. Notable people with this surname include the following:

 Augustus Beeby, British footballer
 Beatrice Beeby (1903–1991), New Zealand educator
 Bruce Beeby (1921–2013), Australian actor
 C. E. Beeby (1902–1998), New Zealand educator
 George Beeby (1869–1942), Australian politician, judge and author
 George Beeby (horse racing) (1904–1977), British horse trainer
 Richard Beeby (born 1962), English football referee
 Thomas H. Beeby (born 1941), American architect
 Victor Beeby (1891–1944), New Zealand cricketer
Chris Beeby, New Zealand diplomat

English-language surnames